Simeon Carl Eugen Joseph Leopold von Habsburg (born 29 June 1958 in Katana, South Kivu, Belgian Congo), also called Simeon Habsburg-Lothringen and Archduke Simeon of Austria, is an Austrian banker, partner and managing director of Principal Asset Management AG in Liechtenstein. He is a member of the House of Habsburg-Lorraine and as such an Archduke of Austria, Prince of Hungary and Bohemia with the style His Imperial and Royal Highness. He is the third-eldest child of Archduke Rudolf of Austria and his first wife, Countess Xenia Czernichev-Besobrasov. Simeon is a paternal grandson of Charles I of Austria, last ruler of Austria-Hungary.

Marriage and issue
Simeon married Princess María of Bourbon-Two Sicilies, daughter of Infante Carlos, Duke of Calabria and his wife Princess Anne of Orléans, on 13 July 1996 in La Toledana, Spain.<ref name=petit>de Badts de Cugnac, Chantal. Coutant de Saisseval, Guy. Le Petit Gotha’’. Nouvelle Imprimerie Laballery, Paris 2002, p. 172-174, 196-197, 404 (French) </ref> Simeon is a (half) second cousin of his wife's father, both being great-grandchildren of Robert I, Duke of Parma. María's father descends from Duke Robert's first marriage and Simeon from the Duke's second marriage.

The couple has five children:

Archduke Johannes Rudolf Antonio Maria of Austria (born 29 October 1997 in Hohenems, Vorarlberg, Austria)
Archduke Ludwig Christian Fransikus Maria of Austria (born 16 November 1998 in Grabs, St. Gallen, Switzerland)
Archduchess Isabelle Rocio Maravillas Lourdes of Austria (born 14 September 2000 in Grabs, St. Gallen, Switzerland)
Archduchess Carlotta Adelaïde Teresa Maria of Austria (born 16 January 2003 in Grabs, St. Gallen, Switzerland)
Archduke Philipp'' Jozef Christian Maria of Austria (born 15 January 2007 in Grabs, St. Gallen, Switzerland)

References

1958 births
House of Habsburg-Lorraine
Living people
Austrian princes